The Asociación Amateurs de Football (AAmF) was a dissident football association of Argentina that organised its own championships from 1919 to 1926. The Argentine Football Association did not recognise those championships until both associations were merged in 1926. Currently all the championships organised by the AAmF are considered official by the AFA.

History 

On 16 March 1919, the Primera División season started with 19 teams taking part. With the 1919 championship still disputing, the conflict began. The Argentine Association rejected representatives from the clubs Estudiantil Porteño, Independiente, Platense, Racing, River Plate and Tigre. As those teams maintained their position, the Association disaffiliated them temporarily.

Meanwhile, seven other clubs, Atlanta, Defensores de Belgrano, Estudiantes (BA), Gimnasia y Esgrima (LP), San Isidro, San Lorenzo and Sportivo Barracas, expressed their solidarity with the suspended clubs; therefore, the association directly expelled them With only 10 fixtures played, the championship was suspended and all the matches played until then were annulled. The breakage was related to (among other reasons) the brown amateurism, an undercover way of professionalism where the clubs informally paid salaries and special prizes to their players.

The 13 clubs that had been disaffiliated or expelled from the AFA joined forces to form a new association with the purpose to organise their own championships. The "Asociación Amateurs de Football" was officially established on 22 September 1919, with an assembly held in the Jockey Club on 6 December.

On the other hand, Boca Juniors, Estudiantes (LP), Eureka, Huracán, Porteño and Sportivo Almagro remained affiliated to the official body. On 28 September, both competitions started, the official (AFA) with only those six teams and the dissident (AAmF) with 14 teams (including the addition of Vélez Sarsfield).

Because of the conflict that made the official championship take longer than expected, the AFA tournament was ended. As a result, Boca Juniors (which was placed 1st at the moment of the decision) was crowned champion with 14 matches yet to be played. The AAmF championship was won by Racing Club.

After seven years of championships held that included the trespassing of clubs from a body to another, on 19 November 1926, President of Argentina Marcelo T. de Alvear called both associations to a reconciliation meeting that laid the foundations for a reunification. As a condition to reach an agreement, the AAmF required that all the teams that had played the 1926 AAmF championship (26 in total) remained in Primera División. This was conceded, and the two associations finally merged on 28 December 1926.

Founding members 

 Atlanta
 Defensores de Belgrano
 Estudiantes (BA)
 Excursionistas
 Gimnasia y Esgrima (LP)
 Independiente
 Platense
 Racing
 River Plate
 Sportivo Barracas
 San Isidro
 San Lorenzo
 Tigre

Competitions 
The AAmF organised several competitions, as listed below:

Domestic 
 Primera División (1919–26)
 División Intermedia (1919–26)
 Segunda División (1919–26)
 Tercera División (1919–26)
 Copa Competencia (1920–26)
 Copa Presidente de la Nación (1919–26)

International 
 Copa Campeonato del Río de la Plata (1923)

Champions

Primera División

División Intermedia

Segunda División

Tercera División

Copa de Competencia

See also 
 Federación Argentina de Football 
 Liga Argentina de Football 
 Football in Argentina

Notes

References 

Defunct football leagues in Argentina
Football governing bodies in Argentina
Sports organizations established in 1919
Organizations disestablished in 1926
1919 establishments in Argentina
Defunct sports governing bodies in Argentina
Defunct association football governing bodies